Tamsita is a genus of tussock moths in the family Erebidae.

Species
 Tamsita habrotima Tams, 1930
 Tamsita ochthoeba Hampson, 1920

References

Natural History Museum Lepidoptera generic names catalog

Lymantriinae
Moth genera